Chord Bible is the generic name given to a variety of musical theory publications featuring a large number of chord diagrams for fretted stringed instruments. The subject matter applies exclusively to chordophones, stringed musical instruments capable of playing more than one note at a time. Members belonging to the chordophone family include the guitar, banjo, mandolin, ukulele, charango, balalaika, bajo sexto  and many other stringed instruments.  With the chord bible, the format only tends to apply to fretted or keyboard instruments where a clear diagram can be illustrated to show the musician where to place his or her fingers on the fingerboard or keyboard.

Allied publications will alternatively be labelled chord dictionaries or chord encyclopaedias, but are essentially laid out in a similar way, albeit in a sometimes truncated format.

Selection of currently available publications

Bouzouki
 
 
 

Guitar
 
 
 
 

Mandolin
 

Piano & Keyboard
 
 
 

Ukulele

Publishers external links
 Apple Press
 Fretted Friends Music/Cabot Books
 IMP/Faber Music
 

Music publications